Emajõe is a genitive form of Emajõgi, a river in Estonia and may refer to:

Emajõe-Suursoo Nature Reserve
Emajõe Business Centre in Tartu
Emajõe Summer Theatre
Emajõe tänav, street in Tartu
Liis Emajõe (born 1991), Estonian footballer
Riin Emajõe (born 1993), Estonian footballer